Dennis William Quaid (born April 9, 1954) is an American actor known for a wide variety of dramatic and comedic roles. First gaining widespread attention in the late 1970s, some of his notable credits include Breaking Away (1979), The Right Stuff (1983), The Big Easy (1986), Innerspace (1987), Great Balls of Fire! (1989), Dragonheart (1996), The Parent Trap (1998), Frequency (2000), The Rookie (2002), The Day After Tomorrow (2004), In Good Company (2004), Yours, Mine & Ours (2005), and Vantage Point (2008).

His other film credits include Any Given Sunday (1999), Traffic (2000), The Alamo (2004), Flight of the Phoenix (2004), American Dreamz (2006), Battle for Terra (2007), G.I. Joe: The Rise of Cobra (2009), Footloose (2011), Soul Surfer (2011), Beneath the Darkness (2012), Playing for Keeps (2012), Truth (2015), The Pretenders (2018), Midway (2019), The Intruder (2019), Blue Miracle (2021), and American Underdog (2021). For his role in Far from Heaven (2002), he won the New York Film Critics Circle Award for Best Supporting Actor among other accolades. The Guardian named him one of the best actors never to have received an Academy Award nomination.

Early life
Dennis William Quaid was born in Houston, Texas, the son of Juanita Bonnie Dale "Nita" (née Jordan), a real estate agent, and William Rudy Quaid (November 21, 1923 – February 8, 1987), an electrician. Quaid has English, Irish, Scots-Irish, and Cajun (French) ancestry. Through his father, Quaid is a first cousin, twice removed, of cowboy performer Gene Autry. He attended Paul W. Horn Elementary School in Bellaire, and Pershing Middle School in Houston. He studied Mandarin and dance at Bellaire High School in Bellaire, Texas, and later in college, at the University of Houston, under drama coach Cecil Pickett, who had previously taught at Bellaire High and whose daughter is actress Cindy Pickett. He was raised in the Baptist faith. Dennis is the younger brother of actor Randy Quaid.

Career

Quaid dropped out of the University of Houston before graduating and moved to Hollywood to pursue an acting career. He initially had trouble finding work but began to gain notice when he appeared in Breaking Away (1979) and earned good reviews for his role as astronaut Gordon Cooper in The Right Stuff (1983).

Known for his grin, Quaid has appeared in both comedic and dramatic roles. Quaid had starring roles in the films The Night the Lights Went Out in Georgia (1981), Jaws 3-D (1983), Dreamscape (1984), Enemy Mine (1985), Innerspace (1987) and The Big Easy (1987). He also achieved acclaim for his portrayal of Jerry Lee Lewis in Great Balls of Fire! (1989). In 1989, he also appeared throughout the Bonnie Raitt music video for the song "Thing Called Love."

Quaid's career lost steam in the early 1990s, after he fought anorexia nervosa brought on when he lost 40 pounds to play the tuberculosis-afflicted Doc Holliday in Wyatt Earp and recovered from a cocaine addiction. He continued to garner positive reviews in a variety of films, however. Quaid was also the guest star of a season 2 episode of Muppets Tonight (1997). He starred in the lead role in the 1996 adventure film Dragonheart, the remake of The Parent Trap (1998), playing the part of the twins' father, and as an aging pro football quarterback in Oliver Stone's Any Given Sunday (1999). In 1998, he made his debut as a film director with Everything That Rises, a television movie western in which he also starred.

Some of Quaid's film credits include Frequency (2000), Dinner with Friends (2001), The Rookie (2002), Far from Heaven (2002), Cold Creek Manor (2003), Flight of the Phoenix (2004), The Alamo (2004), In Good Company (2004), The Day After Tomorrow (2004), Yours, Mine & Ours (2005), Vantage Point (2008), G.I. Joe: The Rise of Cobra (2009), and Pandorum (2009).

In 2009, Quaid guest starred in an episode of SpongeBob SquarePants, playing Mr. Krabs' grandfather, Captain Redbeard.

He portrayed U.S. President Bill Clinton, alongside Michael Sheen as Tony Blair and Hope Davis as Hillary Clinton, in the 2010 film The Special Relationship.

In 2012 and 2013, Quaid played Sheriff Ralph Lamb in the CBS TV drama series Vegas.

In 2017, he starred in A Dog's Purpose as Ethan Montgomery, billed as "a celebration of the special connection between humans and their dogs".

In 2018, Quaid starred in I Can Only Imagine, where he played Arthur Millard, the father of singer and songwriter Bart Millard, and Kin, where he plays Hal, the father of the film's two protagonists.

In 2019, he portrayed Vice Admiral William 'Bull' Halsey in Midway.

In March 2018, it was confirmed by director Sean McNamara that Quaid would portray President Ronald Reagan in an upcoming biopic, titled Reagan, this would be the second time Quaid portrayed a U.S. president. The film was slated to have a summer 2019 release, however it is still in pre-production  and was scheduled to begin filming in May 2020, but was postponed due to the COVID-19 pandemic.

Personal life

Relationships and children
Quaid has been married four times and has three children.

Quaid met his first wife, actress P. J. Soles, on the set of the film Our Winning Season. They were married in 1978. The couple divorced in 1983.

On February 14, 1991, Quaid married actress Meg Ryan. Quaid and Ryan fell in love during the shooting of their second film together, D.O.A. Quaid and Ryan have a son, Jack Henry Quaid (born April 24, 1992). Quaid and Ryan announced their separation on June 28, 2000, saying they had been separated six weeks by then. Their divorce was finalized in July 2001.

Quaid dated model Shanna Moakler from February 2001 to October 2001.

Quaid married Texas real-estate agent Kimberly Buffington on July 4, 2004, at his ranch in Paradise Valley, Montana. They have fraternal twins who were born via a surrogate on November 8, 2007, in Santa Monica, California.

On November 18, 2007, hospital staff mistakenly gave Quaid's ten-day-old twins a dosage of heparin (a blood thinner) that was 1,000 times the common dosage for infants. The babies recovered, but Quaid filed a lawsuit against the drug manufacturer, Baxter Healthcare, claiming that packaging for the two doses of heparin are not different enough. In May 2008, the Quaids testified before the United States House Committee on Oversight and Government Reform, asking U.S. Congress not to preempt the right to sue drug manufacturers for negligence under state law. This incident led Quaid to become a patient-safety advocate, producing a series of documentaries on preventable medical errors that aired on the Discovery Channel as well as co-authoring a medical journal article addressing the positive influence of patient stories in motivating change in healthcare. The first documentary, Chasing Zero: Winning the War on Healthcare Harm, aired on the Discovery Channel in 2010, and the second documentary, Surfing the Healthcare Tsunami: Bring Your Best Board, aired on the Discovery Channel in 2012.

Buffington filed for divorce from Quaid in March 2012. Buffington's attorney then withdrew the divorce papers on April 26, 2012. In the summer of 2012, Quaid and Buffington moved to California. In October 2012, Quaid and Buffington again decided to separate, and Buffington filed for legal separation, seeking joint legal and sole physical custody of the twins. After waiting to establish the required six months of residency in California, Quaid filed for divorce on November 30, 2012, asking for joint legal and physical custody of the children and offering to pay spousal support to Buffington. They then reconciled and the divorce was dismissed by September 2013. On June 28, 2016, the couple announced in a joint statement that they were divorcing, with Buffington asking for full physical custody and joint legal custody. The divorce was finalized on April 27, 2018.

Following his separation from Buffington, Quaid dated model Santa Auzina from July 2016 to 2019.

On October 21, 2019, Quaid confirmed his engagement to Laura Savoie. After postponing their original wedding date due to the COVID-19 pandemic, they married on June 2, 2020, in Santa Barbara.

Religion
Quaid is a Christian, writing the Christian song "On My Way to Heaven" dedicated to his mother and included in the film I Can Only Imagine, in which he starred.

Interests
In addition to acting, Quaid is a musician and plays with his band, the Sharks. He wrote and performed the song "Closer to You" in the film The Big Easy (1987). Quaid also has a pilot's license and owned a Cessna Citation. He is also a one-handicap golfer, and in 2005, he was named as the top golfer among the "Hollywood set" by Golf Digest magazine.

Quaid is a fan of the Houston Astros, and after the team's 2005 National League Championship-winning season, he narrated their commemorative DVD release. After the filming of The Express: The Ernie Davis Story, Quaid went to Cleveland Browns Stadium to dedicate Davis's jersey.

Quaid began podcasting during 2020. He started The Pet Show with Dennis Quaid and Jimmy Jellinek. Its first episode premiered on July 10, 2020. During that podcast, he learned of a cat in Lynchburg, Virginia also named Dennis Quaid. He adopted the cat and flew it out to California to live at his recording studio.

Substance use
There have been extensive stories about Quaid's past abuse of cocaine. In a candid 2002 interview with Larry King on his talk show, after King asked about his motives for using drugs, Quaid responded,
"Well, you got to put it in context. Back in the late 1960s, early 1970s. That was back during the time where, you know, drugs were going to expand our minds and everybody was experimenting and everything. We were really getting high, we didn't know it. And cocaine at that time was considered harmless. You know. I remember magazine articles in People Magazine of doctors saying it is not addicting. It is just—alcohol is worse. So I think we all fell into that. But that's not the way it was."
When asked if he believed he had ever been addicted to the drugs, he responded, "It was a gradual thing. But it got to the point where I couldn't have any fun unless I had it. Which is a bad place to be." Later in the interview he said, "But I saw myself being dead in about five years if I didn't stop."

Political views
In a 2018 interview with the New York Post, Quaid stated he was a registered independent and has voted for both Democratic and Republican candidates, saying that he did not consider himself an adherent to any particular ideology; though he did opine that Ronald Reagan was his favorite U.S. president of his lifetime. In April 2020, during the COVID-19 pandemic, Quaid stated that President Donald Trump was handling the pandemic well, calling him "involved". He subsequently recorded an interview with infectious disease expert Anthony Fauci as part of an advertising campaign by the Department of Health and Human Services to "defeat despair" surrounding COVID-19.

Filmography

Film

Television

Home video

Viewpoint with Dennis Quaid 

Viewpoint with Dennis Quaid is a series of short films focused on public-interest topics that is hosted by Dennis Quaid. Since 2012 it has been airing through the Corporation for Public Broadcasting and other outlets.

Accolades 

For his role in Far from Heaven (2002) he won the New York Film Critics Circle Award for Best Supporting Actor, the Chicago Film Critics Association Award for Best Supporting Actor, the Online Film Critics Society Award for Best Supporting Actor and the Independent Spirit Award for Best Supporting Male. He received nominations for Best Supporting Actor from the Golden Globe Awards, the Phoenix Film Critics Society Awards and the Screen Actors Guild Awards. Quaid was also honored with a Distinguished Alumni Award from his alma mater, the University of Houston, in April 2012.

Awards and nominations

References

Further reading
 Author describes Quaid's participation in the film Great Balls of Fire.

External links

 
 
 
 Interview with Dennis Quaid at Everybody's All American press junket at Texas Archive of the Moving Image
 Interview on KVUE with Dennis Quaid in 1987 about Innerspace from Texas Archive of the Moving Image

1954 births
20th-century American male actors
21st-century American male actors
American aviators
American Christians
American male film actors
American male television actors
American male voice actors
American people of English descent
American people of French descent
American people of Irish descent
American people of Scotch-Irish descent
Bellaire High School (Bellaire, Texas) alumni
Independent Spirit Award for Best Male Lead winners
Independent Spirit Award for Best Supporting Male winners
Living people
Male actors from Houston
Outstanding Performance by a Cast in a Motion Picture Screen Actors Guild Award winners
Texas Independents
University of Houston alumni